Bangladesh Amateur Boxing Federation is the national federation for boxing and is responsible for governing the sport in Bangladesh. Major General Mizanur Rahman Shamim, Director General of Bangladesh Ansar and Village Defence Party, is the current chairman of Bangladesh Amateur Boxing Federation.

History
Bangladesh Amateur Boxing Federation was established in 1972. In 2012, it started a national women's boxing competition. In 2020, the Federation announced plans to hold the Bangabandhu International SAFF Junior Boxing Tournament, a seven nations tournament.

References

Boxing in Bangladesh
Amateur boxing organizations
National members of the Asian Boxing Confederation
1972 establishments in Bangladesh
Sports organizations established in 1972
Boxing
Organisations based in Dhaka